Dale is an unincorporated community and census-designated place located on State Highway 270 in Pottawatomie County, Oklahoma, United States. It lies in the North Canadian River bottom, a few miles northwest of Shawnee. The 2010 census recorded a population of 186.

Dale was platted along the Rock Island railroad line before statehood. The Dale Post Office opened October 26, 1893. Initially named King, for John King, an Absentee-Shawnee Indian who owned the allotted land on which the community was founded.  The community was renamed in 1895, for Frank Dale, the second Chief Justice of the Territorial Supreme Court (1893-1898).

Demographics

References

Sources
Shirk, George H. Oklahoma Place Names. Norman: University of Oklahoma Press, 1987.  .

Unincorporated communities in Pottawatomie County, Oklahoma
Unincorporated communities in Oklahoma
Census-designated places in Oklahoma
Populated places established in 1893
1893 establishments in Oklahoma Territory